Disparithelphusa pecki is a species of freshwater crab in the family Pseudothelphusidae, and the only species in the genus Disparithelphusa.

They were deposited at the Museum of Natural History, Tulane University, and described as a new species by Alfred Smalley and Daniel Adkinson in 1984.

The species is listed as Data Deficient on the IUCN Red List.

References

Pseudothelphusidae
Freshwater crustaceans of North America
Endemic crustaceans of Mexico
Monotypic arthropod genera